The Château de Castelnau-Bretenoux is a castle in the commune of Prudhomat, Lot département, France. One of the most impressive in the Quercy region, it has been listed as a monument historique by the French Ministry of Culture since 1862.

History
Construction began about 1100, under Hugues, baron of Castelnau, who built a wall around his manor.  He was the ancestor of the powerful dynasty of Castelnau, who owned a rich and prosperous region and were vassals of the Counts of Toulouse.

The castle was enlarged several times between the 12th and the 15th century, when it was necessary to adapt the fortifications to artillery.

It was taken by Henry II of England in 1159, and returned to the barons of Castelnau at the end of the Hundred Years' War.

During the 17th century, the castle was improved in an aesthetical and practical way: large windows, richly decorated salons, balcony of honor.

The castle fall into disrepair after the death of the last Castelnau in 1715. In 1895 it was bought by Jean Mouliérat, a singer with the Paris Opéra Comique and also a collector of furniture and sacred artworks. He undertook the restoration and furnished the castle with his collection. After his death in 1932, the castle was given to the state.  Visitors can see seven rooms in this fortress, restored and furnished in the medieval style.

Description

The castle of Castelnau-Brenenoux is located on the top of a hill, at the intersection of several valleys; among them is the river Dordogne. The castle is visible from a distance and easily recognizable by its walls of red stone.

The layout is nearly a triangle, with round towers at each angle. The square keep and the main building of the medieval period still remain. Its conception was very imposing, with three enclosing walls, wide curtain walls, and nine round towers.

A small village has surrounded the castle, along the slopes of the hill.

See also
 List of castles in France

References

External links

 Château de Castelnau-Bretenoux - official site
 
 Aerial picture

Châteaux in Lot (department)
Historic house museums in Occitania (administrative region)
Museums in Lot (department)
Monuments historiques of Lot (department)
Monuments of the Centre des monuments nationaux